Norville Carey (born 3 August 1993) is a British Virgin Islands professional basketball player, who last played for New Heroes of the Dutch Basketball League (DBL). Carey played three seasons of collegiate basketball for Southern Mississippi and one season for Rider.

Early life
Born on the British Virgin Islands, Carey started playing volleyball. However, he quickly switched to basketball and when offered the opportunity he moved to the United States to play high school basketball over there.

Professional career
On 21 July 2017 Carey signed with New Heroes Den Bosch of the Dutch Basketball League (DBL).

References

External links
Rider Broncs bio

1993 births
Living people
British Virgin Islands men's basketball players
Dutch Basketball League players
Forwards (basketball)
Heroes Den Bosch players
People from Tortola
Poitiers Basket 86 players
Rider Broncs men's basketball players
Southern Miss Golden Eagles basketball players
British Virgin Islands expatriate basketball people in the United States
British Virgin Islands expatriate basketball people in the Netherlands
British Virgin Islands expatriate basketball people in France